The 1894–95 international cricket season was from September 1894 to April 1895.

Season overview

December

England in Australia

References

International cricket competitions by season
1894 in cricket
1895 in cricket